Dhwaja is a 2018 Indian Kannada-language political action film written by R. S. Durai Senthilkumar and directed by Ashok Cashyap and produced by Sudha Basavegowda under CBG Productions. It stars Ravi Gowda, Priyamani and Divya Urudga with T.N Seetharam, Veena Sundhar and Bala Rajwadi as a lead negative role. Ravi Gowda who is making his Debut through this movie played dual role in his first venture. The film is the remake of 2016 Tamil film Kodi. The film's features songs composed  by Santhosh Narayanan and Chinna, with the former's music re-used from the original, Kodi.  The background score was composed by Chinna.the cinematography is performed by the director Ashok Cashyap himself.

Besides Bangalore, the filming took place in Mysore, and the climax scene was shot at Mysore, Karnataka.

Cast
Ravi Gowda in a dual role as Dhwaja and Janardhan
Priyamani as Ramya, Dhwaja's Girlfriend, the main antagonist
Bala Rajwadi as Balaramanna, lead villain role
Divya Urudga as Moote Mahalakshmi, egg seller, Janardhan's love interest
Veena Sundhar as Dhwaja and Janardhan's mother
T.N.Seetharam as president of the opposition party and former CM

Soundtrack
. The soundtrack album for Dhwaja is composed by Santhosh Narayanan reusing all tunes from the original film.  The audio rights of the film were acquired by Sony Music India. The complete album was released on 25 April 2018 at Bengaluru.. The album consists of five tracks.

Critical reception 
The indian express wrote, "Although a story like Dhwaja is universal, the film having nothing original leaves a sour impression about the makers. It seems like the film was made only to cash in on the elections that are around the corner."

References

External links
 

2010s Kannada-language films
Indian action films
2018 directorial debut films
Films shot in Mysore
Kannada remakes of Tamil films
Films shot in Bangalore
Films scored by Santhosh Narayanan
Indian political films
Twins in Indian films
2018 action films
Political action films
2010s political films